Heeps is a surname. Notable people with the surname include:

 Andrew Heeps (1899-1981), Scottish footballer
 Cameron Heeps (born 1995), Australian speedway rider
 Debbie Heeps (born 1955), Canadian volleyball player
 Rod Heeps (1938-2002), New Zealand rugby union player

See also
 Heep (surname)